Oberea ceylonica is a species of longhorn beetle in the tribe Saperdini in the genus Oberea, discovered by Plavilstshikov in 1926.

References

C